Isopogon divergens, commonly known as spreading coneflower, is a species of plant in the family Proteaceae and is endemic to the south-west of Western Australia. It is a shrub with pinnate leaves and more or less spherical heads of glabrous pink flowers followed by an oval to cylindrical fruiting cone.

Description

Taxonomy
Isopogon divergens was first formally described in 1830 by Robert Brown in the Supplementum to his Prodromus Florae Novae Hollandiae et Insulae Van Diemen from specimens collected in 1827 near the Swan River, by Charles Fraser.

Distribution and habitat
Spreading coneflower grows in shrubland and heath and is widely distributed between the Murchison River and Lake Grace in the Avon Wheatbelt, Geraldton Sandplains, Jarrah Forest, Mallee and Swan Coastal Plain biogeographic regions in the south-west of Western Australia.

Conservation status
Isopogon divergens is classified as "not threatened" by the Government of Western Australia Department of Parks and Wildlife.

References

divergens
Endemic flora of Western Australia
Eudicots of Western Australia
Plants described in 1830
Taxa named by Robert Brown (botanist, born 1773)